Gongguan can refer to the following places:

China
, a township in Hepu County, Beihai, Guangxi
, a township in Maonan, Maoming, Guangdong
, a township in Xunyang County, Ankang, Shaanxi

Taiwan
Gongguan, Miaoli, a rural township in Miaoli County
Gongguan, Taipei, a commercial district in Taipei
, a section of Zhuangwei, Yilan